Calle Själin (born 2 September 1999) is a Swedish professional ice hockey defenseman currently playing for the Charlotte Checkers in the American Hockey League (AHL) as a prospect to the Florida Panthers of the National Hockey League (NHL). Själin was selected in the fifth round, 145th overall, of the 2017 NHL Entry Draft by the New York Rangers.

Playing career
With his draft rights expired from the Rangers, Själin remained with Leksands IF in the Swedish Hockey League (SHL). In the 2021–22 season, Själin notched career highs with 6 goals and 16 assists for 22 points in 46 regular season games with Leksand.

On 10 June 2022, Själin was signed to a two-year, entry-level contract with the Florida Panthers.

Career statistics

Regular season and playoffs

International

References

External links

1999 births
Living people
Charlotte Checkers (2010–) players
Leksands IF players
New York Rangers draft picks
People from Östersund
Swedish ice hockey defencemen
Timrå IK players
VIK Västerås HK players
Sportspeople from Jämtland County